The dairy processing industry in Uganda is young, rapidly growing, and vibrant.

Economic impact

It was first estimated that livestock contributed 1.7 percent to total national GDP in 2009. That estimate was later revised to about 3.2 percent. By 2014, that contribution had risen to 9 percent of national GDP.

The cattle kept are predominantly indigenous breeds, accustomed to the weather and husbandry practices as practiced by the herder communities, conditions that many exotic breeds could not withstand. Exotic breeds have been introduced, but the majority of farms have mixed breeds, whose productivity, although higher than the traditional breeds, does not match that of the exotics.

Current
According to the government Dairy Development Authority (DDA), in October 2018, annual national milk output stood at 2.2 billion liters, up from 1.8 billion liters annually, as of July 2012. As of 2017, per capita milk consumption in Uganda stood at 62 liters, up from 25 liters in 1986. 80 percent of the milk produced is marketed while 20 percent is consumed by the farming households. 33 percent of the marketed milk is processed, while 67 percent is sold as raw milk. 

By June 2019, annual milk production in the country had risen to 2.4 billion liters, with export earnings from the sector, bringing in US$100 million per year. However, the earning potential could increase to US$500 million annually, if the country would control the high death rates in exotic cattle, attributable to tick-borne diseases, and resistance of the ticks to available acaricides. As of December 2021, the country produced 2.81 billion liters of milk annually. 800 million liters were consumed within Uganda, with over 2 billion liters available for export annually. During the 2019/2020 financial year, Uganda earned US$131.5 million, from milk exports.

Dairy farming is a major activity in the southwestern, central, and northeastern parts of the country, with the sector contributing significantly to the economic, nutritional, and employment opportunities of the rural communities in those areas. Uganda's Central and Western Regions account for about 50 percent of national milk production. This production is predictable and available all year round. During the dry season, the northern, northeastern, and eastern parts of the country experience a drastic reduction in milk output.

Regulatory environment
In 1998, the Ugandan Parliament promulgated the Dairy Industry Act, which created the Dairy Development Authority (DDA), the new industry regulator. DDA started its operations in 2000. The erstwhile national monopoly known as the National Dairy Corporation was privatized in 2006 as part of Brookside Dairy Limited from Kenya. The Ugandan government maintains a minority shareholding.

Major milk processors

From 1993 to 2006, fifteen medium to large scale processing plants were licensed. As of August 2017, total national installed capacity was about 1,400,000 liters per day. The major milk processing companies in Uganda included the following:

 Brookside Dairy Limited
 Jesa Farm Dairy
 Pearl Dairy Farms Limited
 Amos Dairies Uganda Limited
 Paramount Dairies Limited
 GBK Dairy Products Limited
 Lakeside Dairy Limited
 Dairyman's Cheese
 Vital Tomosi Dairy Limited

References

External links
 Uganda milk exports make good inroads into Kenya
 Opportunities and challenges in Uganda’s dairy industry

Agriculture in Uganda
Dairy products companies of Uganda
Dairy industry
Industry in Uganda